Federal Highway 84 (Carretera Federal 84) connects Zapote de Adjuntas, Guanajuato to San José de Bazarte, Jalisco. It provides indirect service to La Piedad, Michoacán.

References

084